Leptodea fragilis, the fragile papershell, is a species of freshwater mussel, an aquatic bivalve mollusk in the family Unionidae, the river mussels. L. fragilis is one of the fastest-growing unionid species and the most abundant unionid species in Lake Erie. Its light-shelled morphology suggests an adaptation to deep water within lakes. 

This species is endemic to the United States. Its natural habitat is rivers.

References

fragilis
Bivalves described in 1820